Epes may refer to:

People 
Given name
 Epes Randolph (1856–1921), American civil engineer
 Epes Sargent (poet) (1813–1880), American writer and editor
 Epes Sargent (soldier) (1690–1762), American soldier and landowner
 Epes W. Sargent (1872–1938), American vaudeville critic

Surname
 James F. Epes (1842–1910), American politician
 Louis S. Epes (1882–1935), American lawyer, judge and politician
 Maria Epes (born 1950), American artist
 Sidney Parham Epes (1865–1900), American politician

Places 
 Epes, Alabama, United States

See also 
 EPE (disambiguation)